Irina Alexandrovna Andreeva (born 26 September 1994) is a Russian sprint canoeist.

She won a silver medal at the 2017 ICF Canoe Sprint World Championships and eight medals at the Canoe Sprint European Championships between 2014 and 2021. She also competed in two events at the 2020 Summer Olympics, held in Tokyo.

References

External links

1994 births
Living people
Sportspeople from Moscow
Russian female canoeists
Olympic canoeists of Russia
Canoeists at the 2020 Summer Olympics
ICF Canoe Sprint World Championships medalists in Canadian